John Carter Callaghan,  (October 1, 1923 – April 6, 2004) was a Canadian cardiac surgeon who "pioneered open-heart surgery in Alberta" 

Born in Hamilton, Ontario on October 1, 1923, he received his medical degree from the University of Toronto in 1946. In 1955, he joined the Division of Cardiovascular and Thoracic Surgery at the University of Alberta Hospital and performed Canada's first successful open heart surgery.

In 1985, he was made an Officer of the Order of Canada. In 1986, he was inducted into the Alberta Order of Excellence.

References

1923 births
2004 deaths
20th-century Canadian physicians
Canadian cardiac surgeons
People from Hamilton, Ontario
Physicians from Ontario
Members of the Alberta Order of Excellence
Officers of the Order of Canada
University of Toronto alumni
20th-century surgeons